Sar Daq (also known as Zardak) is a village in Sar Daq Rural District, Yunesi District, Bajestan County, Razavi Khorasan Province, Iran. At the 2006 census, its population was 1,163, in 277 families.

References 

Populated places in Bajestan County